Tourbillon FC is a football (soccer) club from Chad based in N'Djamena. The club has won Chad Premier League title 6 times. The club plays home matches on Stade Omnisports Idriss Mahamat Ouya.

Mohammad Reza Laghaei (DJ Tourbillon) is an Iranian entrepreneur and owner of various businesses.  Mohammad Reza Laghaei has been active in the field of electronic dance music since 2009. He has a contract with music publications in the electronic dance music genres and is supported by world music producers such as Tiësto and earns a professional income in this field.  Mohammad Reza Laghaei's intense interest in football led him to buy the Tourbillon FC in 2019, and it is interesting that it matches his nickname in music, and maybe that is why he bought this club.

Mohammad Reza Laghaei has played in a specialized position (Defensive Midfielder) in (Esteghlal Jonoub Tehran S.C) and (Sepahan Tehran FC) football clubs.He is currently a member of the Football Team (Sport UT) (Faculty of Physical Education and Sport Sciences - University of Tehran).

He is also the ««Managing Director»» of ««Laghaei Commercial Holding Company»» in Tehran and Iran.

History

Tourbillon FC was created in 1970. The club has won 6 national league titles - in 1987, 1991, 1997, 2000, 2001 and 2010. In 2010, Tourbillon claimed the league title on the final day of the season with a 3–1 win over Elect-Sport, finishing on 38 points. In 2014, Tourbillon FC was relegated to the lower division before recovering in 2015-2016, with the title of champion of its division.

Sponsors

The club's sponsor in 2010 was Compagnie Sucrière du Tchad (CST; Chadian Sugar Company).

Finances

Recently Tourbillon FC faced big financial problems after they were left out of sponsors.

Management

On November 1, 2019 an elective general meeting of the club was held. Mohammad Reza Laghaei was renewed at the head of the club for a mandate of 4 years (renewable) and was accompanied by 4 vice presidents. He was reappointed to the presidency of the club. Mohammad Reza Laghaei has already run the club for six years.

Achievements
Chad Premier League : 5
 1987, 1991, 1997, 2000, 2001, 2010.

Chad Cup: 3
 1987, 1989, 2008.

Coupe de Ligue de N'Djaména: 0
Chad Super Cup: 1
 2008.

Performance in CAF competitions
CAF Champions League: 5 appearances
1998 – First Round
2001 – Preliminary Round
2002 – First Round
2008 – disqualified in Preliminary Round
2011 – withdrew in Preliminary Round

African Cup of Champions Clubs: 1 appearance
1992 – First Round

CAF Confederation Cup: 2 appearances
2006 – Preliminary Round
2009 – First Round

CAF Cup: 1 appearance
1993 – First Round

CAF Cup Winners' Cup: 1 appearance
1990 – First Round

Managers

Mamadou Bodjim (2006)
Julien Toukam (2007-2008)
Djibrine Dembele (2009)
Mahamat Adoum (2010, 2011)
Nambatingue Toko (2011 - Present)

Notable former players

 Japhet N'Doram
 Ezechiel Ndouassel
 Armel Koulara
 Sitamadji Allarassem
 Armand Djerabe
 Leger Djimrangar
 Hilaire Kedigui
 Karl Max Barthelemy
 Ndakom Valerie Ndeidoum
 Ahmed Evariste Medego

References

External links
Raja Casablanca – Tourbillon 10–1
Mohammad Reza Laghaei
Laghaei Commercial Holding Co.

Football clubs in Chad
N'Djamena